Hesperophylax designatus, known generally as the silver-striped sedge or giant golden caddis, is a species of northern caddisfly in the family Limnephilidae. It is found in North America.

Subspecies
These two subspecies belong to the species Hesperophylax designatus:
 Hesperophylax designatus designatus g
 Hesperophylax designatus isolatus Banks, 1943 i c g
Data sources: i = ITIS, c = Catalogue of Life, g = GBIF, b = Bugguide.net

References

Integripalpia
Articles created by Qbugbot
Insects described in 1852